Donald Stewart Henderson (8 August 1918 – 13 September 2010) was an Australian rules footballer who played with Footscray in the Victorian Football League (VFL).

Notes

External links 

1918 births
2010 deaths
Australian rules footballers from Melbourne
Western Bulldogs players
People from Prahran, Victoria